is the private, college-preparatory school located in Gifu, Gifu Prefecture, Japan.

History
1903 - Ryoichi Suzuki established "Sasaki girls' school for sewing" in Nishino-machi, Gifu city.
1908 - It was transferred to Sakuma-cho within the city.
1913 - It was renamed "Sasaki girls' school for practical studies"
1926 - It was retransferred to the present site, Uguisudani-cho.
1948 - It was renamed "Uguisudani girls' high school"
1990 - It was changed to coeducational school and renamed "Uguisudani high school"
1996 - The junior high was established and the system of 6-year secondary education was started.

Uguisudani junior high
In 1996, Uguisudani Jr. high was established in order to start six-year secondary education system and to rise the percentage of Uguisudani high's students who go to first-class universities.

Uguisudani senior high
In 1990, Uguisudani girls' high school adopted a coeducational system and was restarted as "Uguisudani Highschool"

References

External links
 Official Uguisudani High School Website

High schools in Gifu Prefecture
Educational institutions established in 1903
1903 establishments in Japan